TekWar is a science fiction novel written by William Shatner and (uncredited) science fiction author Ron Goulart. It was first published by G. P. Putnam's Sons in October 1989. TekWar is the first of nine novels, and spawned an entire TekWar franchise, which includes the TekWorld comic book series, the video game William Shatner's TekWar, the TekWar TV series, and several related TV movies, including TekLords.

Plot

TekWar is set in the 22nd century and follows Jake Cardigan, a former police officer who is framed for dealing tek, an illegal, mind-altering, digital drug. Sentenced to fifteen years' cryo-imprisonment, he is released after serving only four. Jake goes to work for Walt Bascom, the man behind his early release, and dedicates himself to hunting the real tek lords.

Reception

The novel received negative reviews from People magazine. "Shatner tries to disguise language and narrative weaknesses under a blizzard of futuristic details and a pell-mell plot. It's a nice try, but Tek War is undone by superficial characters and stilted dialogue." The social cataloging website Goodreads gives the book 3.19 stars out of 5, based on 1,248 ratings.  Michael J. Nelson's and Conor Lastowka's podcast series 372 Pages We'll Never Get Back analysed and criticised TekWar in 2018.

Notes

1989 Canadian novels
1989 science fiction novels
Canadian science fiction novels
Collaborative novels
Novels by William Shatner
G. P. Putnam's Sons books